Ram Tere Kitne Nam is a 1985 Indian Hindi-language film, directed by P. Madhavan and produced by Harish Shah. The film stars Sanjeev Kumar and Rekha. It is a remake of the director's own Tamil film Raman Ethanai Ramanadi.

Plot 
Ram (Sanjeev Kumar), funnily called, "Peturam", is an overweight & sensitive young man, who is head over heels in love with beautiful Radha (Rekha), the only sister of Thakur Tej Singh (Prem Chopra) and would like to marry her. When he proposes to marry her, Tej makes fun of him, asks him to gather together at least 10 lakh rupees before he can even be considered as a prospective groom. Crestfallen, Ram re-locates to Bombay, where he starts to work driving a taxi, and buying lottery tickets, all quite in vain, as he finds himself quite far away from his target of 10 lakh rupees. Then one day he meets with a Bollywood Film Director (Shammi Kapoor), who decides to give him a chance in movies. The movie turns out to be a success, making Ram, who is now known as Ram Kumar, a millionaire overnight. Pleased with his success and ensuring that he has more than enough to satisfy Tej Singh, Ram triumphantly returns to his home-town in his chauffeur-driven Mercedes Benz, only to find out that Radha has already been married to a man Aloknath Gupta (Vinod Mehra) and is soon to bear his child. Watch how a devastated Ram Kumar attempts to put the remainder of his life together, in a career that he never wanted in the first place.

Cast 

Sanjeev Kumar as Ram "Peturam" / Ram Kumar
Rekha as Radha Singh
Prem Chopra as Thakur Tej Singh
Shammi Kapoor as Film Director 
Vinod Mehra as Aloknath Gupta 
Sachin as Gopi / Chandan 
Lalita Pawar as Ram's Grandmother
Jagdish Raj as Jailor
Chandrashekhar as Judge
Sudhir as Diwan Lalchand
Yunus Parvez as Chaudhary Harbhajan Singh
Pinchoo Kapoor as Ram Kumar's Lawyer

Soundtrack 
The music was composed by R. D. Burman.

References

External links 
 

1985 films
1980s Hindi-language films
Hindi remakes of Tamil films
Films scored by R. D. Burman
Films directed by P. Madhavan